is a Japanese rock band formed in 1999. The band is best known to Western audiences for its song "Speed", which was featured as the 10th ending theme for the popular anime Naruto.

History
All of the band members were born between 1978 and 1979. Akira and Kentarō were acquaintances in school and regularly made music together, releasing a demo tape in 1999. They later moved to Tokyo, where Shūichirō joined the band in April 2002. Later that year, they released a new demo tape with 9 tracks.

In June 2003 they released their first album,  and in December of the same year they released their second album . During June 2004, the band released a self-titled album as well as re-releasing their first two albums. In July and August of 2004, they took part in the Fuji Rock Festival and in September they released their first major album, Hello Hello Hello. To end the year, they started their first national tour, ending in December. 

The band have also taken part in festivals such as the Rock in Japan Festival and the Nano-Mugen Festival in 2008.

Members
 – vocals, guitar
 – vocals, bass
 – vocals, drums (withdrew on March 10, 2008 for medical reasons, but returned on October 10, 2009)

Discography

Singles
Magic (November 1, 2006)
 (July 19, 2006)
Living in the City (May 10, 2006)
 (August 3, 2005)

Mini albums
BGM? (February 23, 2005)
Hello Hello Hello (September 23, 2004)

Albums
Life Goes On (February 10, 2010)
Fish My Life (July 16, 2008)
Rock Is Harmony (November 22, 2006)
Kiss (September 21, 2005)
 (June 23, 2004)
 (December 3, 2003)
 (June 25, 2003)

References
https://web.archive.org/web/20130421110937/http://www.keikaku.net/
http://www.analogfish.com/

External links
 Official Website
Shūichirō Saitō on Twitter

Japanese rock music groups
Japanese alternative rock groups
Musical groups from Nagano Prefecture